Ghislaine Fortuney Lamothe, also known as Gizou Lamothe, (1935-2020) is a Haitian painter and sculptor. She is the mother of Haitian Prime Minister Laurent Lamothe.

Born Ghislaine Fortuney in Port-au-Prince, Lamothe studied in Madrid before returning to Haiti in 1961. Her works have been exhibited in South America, the United States, and Spain.

References

See Also 
 

1935 births
Haitian painters
Haitian male painters
Haitian sculptors
Living people
Haitian women painters
Haitian women sculptors
People from Port-au-Prince
21st-century women artists